The 2002 European Speedway Club Champions' Cup.

Group A

Final

 October 5, 2002
  Pardubice

See also

2002
Euro C